Adoxophyes parameca is a species of moth of the family Tortricidae first described by Józef Razowski in 2013. It is found on Seram Island in Indonesia. The habitat consists of upper montane forests.

The wingspan is about 24 mm. The forewings are cream ferruginous, suffused with ferruginous and spotted and strigulated (finely streaked) with brown. The markings are brownish, strigulated with dark brown. The hindwings are whitish, slightly tinged with yellow.

Etymology
The species name refers to the ductus seminalis and is derived from Greek paramekes (meaning elongate).

References

Moths described in 2013
Adoxophyes
Moths of Indonesia